Ruja may refer to:
Ruja, an Estonian rock band
 Ruja (EP), an EP by Ruja
 Ruja (album), an LP by Ruja
Ruja, Lower Silesian Voivodeship, a village in Lower Silesian Voivodeship, south-western Poland
Ruja, a village in Agnita town, Sibiu County, Romania
Ruja (Siret), a tributary of the Siret in Iași County, Romania
Ruja (Tazlăul Sărat), a tributary of the Tazlăul Sărat in Bacău County, Romania
Rūja, river in Latvia
Ruja Ignatova (born 1980), Bulgarian-German convicted fraudster